Varsha Gautham (born 12 January 1998) is an Indian sailor. She won the bronze medal at 2014 Asian Games in women's 29er event, along with Aishwarya Nedunchezhiyan. She is the youngest Indian to win an Asian Games medal, at the age of 16. She won Silver medal at 2018 Jakarta Asian Games in  49er event along with Sweta Shervegar.

References

External links

 
 

1998 births
Living people
Indian female sailors (sport)
Asian Games medalists in sailing
Asian Games silver medalists for India
Asian Games bronze medalists for India
Sailors at the 2014 Asian Games
Sailors at the 2018 Asian Games
Medalists at the 2014 Asian Games
Medalists at the 2018 Asian Games